André Foucher (born 2 October 1933 in Cuillé, Mayenne) was a French professional road bicycle racer.

Major results

1955
 national military road race champion
1958
 national independent road race champion
1959
GP de l'Equipe
1960
Circuit Cycliste de la Sarthe
Noyal
1962
GP Amitié Puteaux
Perros-Guirec
Puteaux
1963
Châteaugiron
Giron
1964
Grand Prix du Midi Libre
Preslin
Tour de France:
6th place overall classification
1965
Craon
Grand Prix du Midi Libre
Henon
Querrien
1966
Châteaugiron
Saint-Just
1967
Hennebont
1968
Plouëc-du-Trieux

External links 

Official Tour de France results for André Foucher

1933 births
Living people
Sportspeople from Mayenne
French male cyclists
French Tour de France stage winners
Cyclists from Pays de la Loire